The China–Japan–Korea Friendship Athletic Meeting is an annual international outdoor track and field competition between the East Asian countries of China, Japan and South Korea. Jointly organised by the Chinese Athletic Association, Japan Association of Athletics Federations and Korea Association of Athletics Federations, it was first held in 2014 and host responsibilities rotate between the three nations.

A total of fourteen events are contested, divided evenly between the sexes, with eight track running events, four jumps, and two shot put events. Each nation enters two athletes per individual event and points are awarded based on finishing position, with 10 for first, 8 for second, 7 for third, 6 for fourth, 5 for fifth and 4 for sixth.

The competition builds upon a long-running under-20 athletics competition between the nations.

Editions

Events

Men's events
200 metres
800 metres
400 metres hurdles
4 × 400 metres relay
High jump
Triple jump
Shot put
Women's events
100 metres
400 metres
100 metres hurdles
4 × 100 metres relay
Pole vault
Long jump
Shot put

See also
China–Japan–South Korea trilateral summit

References

 
2014 establishments in China
Athletics competitions in Asia
International athletics competitions
Recurring sporting events established in 2014
Sport in East Asia